The Storyman is singer Chris de Burgh's 16th original album, released in 2006. The album is a collection of songs with accompanying stories. The original digipack release of the album included two booklets; one contained the usual lyrics and credits, while the second contained stories written by de Burgh to accompany each song.

The lyrics of the title track contain multiple references to previous songs and albums from de Burgh's career, in chronological order.

Track listing
"The Storyman Theme" – 4:00
"One World" – 3:56
"Leningrad" – 5:12
"My Father's Eyes" – 4:18
"The Grace Of A Dancer" – 6:13
"Spirit" – 4:16
"The Shadow Of The Mountain" – 4:19
"Raging Storm" – 4:18 (featuring Kristyna Myles)
"The Mirror Of The Soul" – 9:15
"The Sweetest Kiss Of All" – 3:13
"The Storyman" – 4:37
"My Father's Eyes" (Chris de Burgh with Hani Hussein) - 4:35

All compositions by Chris de Burgh.

Personnel 

 Chris de Burgh – vocals, keyboards, guitars
 Richard Cardwell – keyboards
 Peter Gordeno – additional keyboards
 Pete Murray – additional keyboards
 Chris Cameron – acoustic piano, orchestral arrangements and conductor
 Phil Palmer – guitars
 Michael Féat – bass guitar
 Geoff Dugmore – drums, percussion
 Pandit Dinesh – percussion
 Nick Ingman – orchestral conductor
 The Royal Philharmonic Orchestra – orchestra
 Hani Hussein – vocals on "My Father's Eyes"
 Kristyna Myles – vocals on "Raging Storm"
 The Mahotella Queens – vocals
 The London Russian Choir and The Marlborough College Chamber Choir – choirs
 Ian Sutcliffe – director and arrangements for The Marlborough College Chamber Choir.
 Lidya Reinski – director and arrangements for The London Russian Choir.

Production 

 Produced by Chris de Burgh and Chris Porter
 Engineered and Mixed by Chris Porter
 Orchestra recordings at Abbey Road Studios (London), assisted by Andrew Dudman.
 Band recordings at Metropolis Studios (London), assisted by Rohan Onraet.
 Photography – David Morley
 Art Direction – Brett Colledge and Mike McCraith.
 Sleeve Design – Chris de Burgh, Caroline McCrink and Kenny Thomson.
 Management – Kenny Thomson Management, Inc.

Chris de Burgh albums
2006 albums